Gavin Smith (25 September 1915 – October 1992) was a professional footballer who played for Dumbarton and Barnsley.

References 

1915 births
1992 deaths
Scottish footballers
Association football wingers
Scottish Football League players
English Football League players
Dumbarton F.C. players
Barnsley F.C. players
Huddersfield Town A.F.C. wartime guest players